Neil Stanley Joseph (born 1906, date of death unknown) was a Sri Lankan cricketer who played for All-Ceylon in the 1930s. In a one-day match against the touring Australians in 1930, he dismissed Don Bradman hit wicket with the first ball he bowled.

Neil Joseph went to Royal College, Colombo. In 1925 he scored his first Royal-Thomian century, a superb 113 made in only 65 minutes. In 1926 he scored 133. His aggregate of 317 runs for the series stood unbeaten until 1957.

He played eight first-class matches for Ceylon between 1932 and 1935. His highest score was 78 against MCC in 1933–34, when no one else for Ceylon in the match reached 30. He went on Ceylon's first tour, to India in 1932-33.

He worked as a newspaper reporter.

References

External links

D. W. L. Lieversz, My Recollections of Cricket at Royal From 1923 to 1929

Sri Lankan cricketers
All-Ceylon cricketers
1906 births
Year of death missing
Sri Lankan Tamil sportspeople
Alumni of Royal College, Colombo